Buckhorn may refer to:

Places

Canada
 Buckhorn, Ontario

Germany
 Buckhorn (Hamburg U-Bahn station), in Hamburg-Volksdorf

United Kingdom
 Buckhorn, Devon, a United Kingdom location
 Buckhorn Weston, Dorset

United States
 Buckhorn, Amador County, California 
 Buckhorn, Ventura County, California 
 Buckhorn, Illinois
 Buckhorn, Kentucky
 Buckhorn, Michigan
 Buckhorn, Madison County, Missouri
 Buckhorn, Pulaski County, Missouri
 Buckhorn, North Carolina
 Buckhorn, Pennsylvania
 Buckhorn Township (disambiguation)

Other uses
 A type of iron sight on a firearm
 A common name of the perennial herb Plantago lanceolata

See also
 Buckhorn Lake (disambiguation)
 Buckhorn High School (disambiguation)